Frank Whittaker (born 1894; died 1961) was the first Bishop - in - Medak in the Church of South India, with his see in Medak in the Indian state of Hyderabad. Originally a Methodist, he became a bishop when several denominations in India merged to form the Church of South India on 27 September 1947.

Earlier, Whittaker had been the first head of the Normal Training College in Medak.

Rajaiah David Paul writes that in March 1960, Whittaker vacated the cathedral, paving way for Eber Priestley who was appointed on 1 November 1960 the same year and moved to Dornakal to teach at the Andhra Union Theological College. However, nearly a year later, due to ill-health, Whittaker died in Dornakal on 10 December 1961.

References
Notes

Further reading
 

 

Telugu people
Anglican bishops of Medak
20th-century Anglican bishops in India
Academic staff of the Senate of Serampore College (University)
Indian Christian theologians
1894 births
1961 deaths
Alumni of St John's College, Cambridge
Church of South India clergy